Judicial misconduct occurs when a judge acts in ways that are considered unethical or otherwise violate the judge's obligations of impartial conduct.

Actions that can be classified as judicial misconduct include: conduct prejudicial to the effective and expeditious administration of the business of the courts (as an extreme example: "falsification of facts" at summary judgment); using the judge's office to obtain special treatment for friends or relatives; accepting bribes, gifts, or other personal favors related to the judicial office; having improper discussions with parties or counsel for one side in a case; treating litigants or attorneys in a demonstrably egregious and hostile manner; violating other specific, mandatory standards of judicial conduct, such as judicial rules of procedure or evidence, or those pertaining to restrictions on outside income and requirements for financial disclosure; and acting outside the jurisdiction of the court, or performance of official duties if the conduct might have a prejudicial effect on the administration of the business of the courts among reasonable people.  Rules of official misconduct also include rules concerning disability, which is a temporary or permanent condition rendering a judge unable to discharge the duties of the particular judicial office.

In India
Justice C. S. Karnan was sentenced to six months of imprisonment by the Supreme Court of India, holding him guilty of contempt of court. He was the first Indian High Court judge to be sent to prison for contempt while in office.

In the United Kingdom
In the UK, judicial misconduct is investigated by the Judicial Conduct Investigations Office.

In the United States
A judicial investigative committee is a panel of judges selected to investigate a judicial misconduct complaint against a judge accused of judicial misconduct. Judicial investigative committees are rarely appointed. According to U.S. Court statistics, only 18 of the 1,484 judicial misconduct complaints filed in the United States Courts between September 2004 and September 2007 resulted in the formation of judicial investigative committees.

Notable judges involved in misconduct allegations
 Michigan Supreme Court Justice Diane Hathaway
 United States Supreme Court Justice Samuel Chase, who was acquitted on articles of impeachment
 Chief Justice of the Alabama Supreme Court Roy Moore
 Chief Justice of the New Hampshire Supreme Court David A. Brock
 District Judge Shelley M. Richmond Joseph
 Superior Court Judge James Towery, County of Santa Clara Judge Towery
 In re James D. Heiple, No. 97 CC 1 (4/30/1997) (Respondent, Chief Justice of the Illinois Supreme Court, was censured for conduct that is prejudicial to the administration of justice and brings the judicial office into disrepute for violating the Code of Judicial Conduct, Illinois Supreme Court Rules 61 and 62(A).  Specifically, Respondent belligerently volunteered information that he was a member of the judiciary (e.g., "Do you know who you are talking to?”  “Do you know who I am?”) after being detained by police who suspected that he had violated traffic laws.  Moreover, on three occasions, Respondent displayed an Illinois Supreme Court Justice identification credential to law enforcement to avoid receiving traffic citations.  Respondent knew or should have known that communicating such information was likely to influence the officers who were investigating him and would be perceived by them as an attempt to use his judicial office to preclude being charged with traffic violations.)

See also
Judicial murder
 Legal abuse
 Malfeasance in office
 Judicial corruption
 Judicial immunity

References

External links
 Above the Law: Judicial Misconduct – Site specializing in news on the topic

 
Judicial legal terminology